Lactate may refer to:

 Lactation, the secretion of milk from the mammary glands
 Lactate, the conjugate base of lactic acid